Pelita Jaya Basketball Club is the basketball club owned by Bakrie Group through Indra Bakrie. Competing in the Perbasi's highest division since 1989, Pelita Jaya became 3x champions in 1990, 1991-1992 and 2016/2017.

Club history 
Pelita Jaya Basketball is a professional basketball club based in Jakarta. Born in October 1988 as the involvement of the Bakrie Business Group in its efforts to participate in fostering national sports achievements. Over time, this idea transformed into an obsession and commitment to continue developing Pelita Jaya Basketball as a realization of the contribution of the Bakrie family to the community (in the field of sports), to become the number one basketball club in Indonesia.

Pelita Jaya Basketball once acquired the semi-professional clubs, Citra Satria Jakarta for 2000 & 2001 season as Bali Jeff Citra Satria-Pelita and Dwidasa Mitra Guntur for 2004 & 2005 season as Mitra Kalila.

After running for more than 30 years, Pelita Jaya Basketball athletes have proven able to score achievements on a national and international scale. They also took part in raising the name of the nation in the arena of the SEA Games and the Asian Games.

Pelita Jaya Basketball, which is now under the auspices of PT Pelita Jaya Bakrie, has become one of the pioneers in the professionals sport management in Indonesia who manages the provision of funds, infrastructure, educational scholarships, recruitment and coaching systems to achievements.

Roster

Notable alumni

Players
- Set a club record or won an individual award as a professional player.
- Played at least one official international match for his senior national team at any time.
  Ali Budimansyah 
  Ary Chandra
  Dimas Aryo Dewanto
  Govinda Julian Saputra 
  Ponsianus Nyoman Indrawan
  Vincent Rivaldi Kosasih 	
  Andi Poedjakesuma
  Adhi Pratama
  Amin Prihantono
  Tri Hartanto 
  Wayne Bradford
  Michael Hodges

Coaches
- Set a club record or won an individual award as a professional coach.
- Functioned as head coach for any senior national team at least once at an official international match.

 Johannis Winar

References 

Basketball
Basketball teams in Indonesia
Basketball teams established in 1988
 
1988 establishments in Indonesia